Wood Eaton may refer to:
Woodeaton, Oxfordshire, England (older spelling)
Wood Eaton, Staffordshire, England